Vedetta was the name of at least three ships of the Italian Navy and may refer to:

 , an aviso in service 1862-1903 (:it:Vedetta (avviso))
 , a  launched in 1954 for the German Navy, transferred in 1957 to Ethiopia as Zerai Deres, returned to the United States shortly after and renamed USS PC-1616. Transferred to Italy in 1959 as Vedetta and decommissioned in 1978.
 , an  launched in 1997. 

Italian Navy ship names